The Vyborg Manifesto; also called the Vyborg Appeal) was a proclamation signed by several Russian politicians, primarily Kadets and Trudoviks) of the dissolved First Duma on .

In the wake of the 1905 Revolution, Russia's first modern parliament, the State Duma, was convoked. It rapidly became a voice of radicalism and liberalism, and was subsequently dissolved by the Tsarist government 72 days after convocation. Outraged, several of the members of the first Duma travelled to Vyborg in the autonomous Grand Duchy of Finland, where they signed a 'manifesto' calling for 'passive resistance' which included evading taxes and defying conscription orders. 

The manifesto was met with 'universal indifference', which allowed the Tsarist authorities to silence the manifesto's contributors, and they were all banned from participating in future Dumas. The result was that the Kadet party turned towards conservatism and no longer consciously identifying themselves as a party for 'the people'.

Background
The Constitutional Democratic Party was formed in Moscow from 12 to 18 October 1905 at the height of the Russian Revolution of 1905 when Tsar Nicholas II was forced to sign the October Manifesto, granting basic civil liberties. The Kadets were to the immediate left of the Octobrists, another liberal party organized at the same time. Unlike the Octobrists, who were committed to constitutional monarchy from the start, the Kadets were at first ambiguous on the subject but demanded universal suffrage (even for women) and a Constituent Assembly that would determine the country's form of government. The Kadets were one of the parties invited by the reform-minded Prime Minister Sergei Witte to join his cabinet in October and November 1905, but the negotiations broke down over the Kadets' radical demands and Witte's refusal to drop notorious reactionaries like Petr Nikolayevich Durnovo from the cabinet.

In the wake of the 1905 Revolution, Russia's first modern parliament, the first Duma, was convoked. It rapidly turned into a revolutionary tribune, "a rhetorical battering ram against the fortress of autocracy". On the first day of the Duma, the parliamentarians condemned the government's political repression, and demands of amnesty of political prisoners became voiced from the Tauride Palace. The calls commenced after a boat full of representatives sailed down the Neva and passed by the Kresty prison, and a tearful and emotional waving encounter between the prisoners and the representatives happened. As the representatives found their seats Ivan Petrunkevich, the leader of the Constitutional Democratic Party (Kadets), asked upon the assembly to devote their first free thoughts and words to "those who sacrificed their own freedom for the liberation of our dear Russia". The hall burst into shouting "Amnesty, Amnesty" towards the ministers attending, and amnesty for the political prisoners, a prerogative exclusively held by the Tsar, were included in an address to the Emperor that also included demands for increased liberties such as universal suffrage, radical land reforms, further executive powers to the Duma, a government responsible to the parliament and the abolition of the reactionary consultative State Council. After two weeks of silence, the government passed its two first bills for the approval of the Duma, one for the construction of a greenhouse at the University of Dorpat and one for the a new laundry. That was in effect a declaration of a "legislative war", as the government would not even recognise the demands of reform from the Duma.

It was clear by then that it was only a matter of time before the Duma became dissolved, and after further radical speeches in the Duma, it was dissolved 72 days after it was convoked, on the 21 July (8 July O.S.) New elections for a second Duma was called for the following February, and Prime Minister Ivan Goremykin was replaced by Stolypin, who was a well-known advocate for the abolition of the communal system and was known for repressive measures to restore order in the provinces. The liberals of the first Duma were subsequently outraged. Prince Georgy Lvov was one of those outraged by the "blatant attack on the parliamentary principle" even though he had opposed the land reform. He became radicalised after he had been a "moderate liberal". The government, on the other hand, deemed the Duma "dysfunctional".

Manifesto

Lvov became one of the Kadets who travelled to Vyborg (Finnish: Viipuri), Finland's second city, to protest the government. There, the Kadet members and liberals signed a manifesto, calling on the Russian people to rebel against the government by refusing to pay taxes or to provide recruits for the army.

According to the historian Orlando Figes, the Vyborg Manifesto was "a typical example of the Kadets' militant posturing" since Duma's opening. 

The Manifesto was written by Pavel Milyukov and signed by 120 Kadet and 80 Trudovik and Social Democrat deputies, alongside some other political representatives like Social Revolutionaries and Muslims.

Aftermath

The Manifesto was met with nearly-universal indifference from the people. That allowed the government to use repressive methods to silence its most outspoken liberal critics. Over 100 leading members of the Kadet Party were brought to trial and then suspended from the Duma for their participation in the manifesto. They were replaced in the Second and the Third Dumas by less radical and less talented politicians than those who had been suspended. The new politicians also went along a more conservative line and stayed within the Tsar's laws to defend the parliament, as the party now lived in the "shadow of the "Vyborg complex"". The entire Kadet leadership was one of the groups that were targeted by being banned from participation in future Dumas.

As a result of the events surrounding the Manifesto, the Kadet Party lost all trust in the people's support and no longer claimed to represent them either. Instead, they consciously became what they de facto had been all along, the "natural party" of the bourgeois. The liberals' failure to rally the masses in defence of the Duma in practice left them "high and dry" and only clinging on in the hope of persuading the Tsarist regime to liberalise itself and with an even larger fear of 'the masses'. 

Despite their change towards conservatism, the government remained suspicious of the Kadets until the fall of the monarchy in 1917.

Signatories

Pyotr Dmitriyevich Dolgorukov
Sergey Muromtsev
Pavel Novgorodtsev
Sergey Urusov
Note: Georgy Lvov became ill whilst travelling to Vyborg and had to return to the capital. It is however clear that he sympathised with it.

References

Bibliography
 
 Gross, David (ed.) We Won’t Pay!: A Tax Resistance Reader,  pp. 307–312
 Lee, Stephen J. Lenin and Revolutionary Russia, Routledge, 2003
 Phillips, Steve. Lenin and the Russian Revolution, Heinemann, 2000,

External links
Text of Vyborg Manifesto 
English Translation

1905 Russian Revolution
Tax resistance
1906 in the Russian Empire
1906 documents